The Beraha constants are a series of mathematical constants by which the   Beraha constant is given by

 

The following table summarizes the first ten Beraha constants.

See also 
 Chromatic polynomial

Notes

References 

Beraha, S. Ph.D. thesis. Baltimore, MD: Johns Hopkins University, 1974.
Le Lionnais, F. Les nombres remarquables. Paris: Hermann, p. 143, 1983.
Saaty, T. L. and Kainen, P. C. The Four-Color Problem: Assaults and Conquest. New York: Dover, pp. 160–163, 1986.
Tutte, W. T. "Chromials." University of Waterloo, 1971.
Tutte, W. T. "More about Chromatic Polynomials and the Golden Ratio." In Combinatorial Structures and their Applications: Proc. Calgary Internat. Conf., Calgary, Alberta, 1969. New York: Gordon and Breach, p. 439, 1969.
Tutte, W. T. "Chromatic Sums for Planar Triangulations I: The Case ," Research Report COPR 72–7, University of Waterloo, 1972a.
Tutte, W. T. "Chromatic Sums for Planar Triangulations IV: The Case ." Research Report COPR 72–4, University of Waterloo, 1972b.

Mathematical constants